Yohanis Tjoe (born 19 July 1985) is an Indonesian professional footballer who plays as a defender for Liga 2 club PSBS Biak.

International career
His first cap for Indonesia was in a friendly match against Cameroon on March 25, 2015.

Honours

Club honors
Persipura Jayapura
 Indonesia Super League: 2010–11, 2013
 Indonesian Inter Island Cup: 2011
 Indonesia Soccer Championship A: 2016

References

External links
 Profile in Liga Indonesia Official Website

1991 births
Living people
Papuan sportspeople
Indonesian Christians
Indonesian footballers
Indonesian people of Chinese descent
Liga 1 (Indonesia) players
PSMS Medan players
Pro Duta FC players
Persipura Jayapura players
Association football defenders
People from Jayapura
Sportspeople from Papua